Ray Hass is a former Australian backstroke swimmer. Originally from South Africa, Hass immigrated to Australia with his family in 1993 and was an Australian Institute of Sport scholarship holder.

Swimming career
After swimming the heat of the 4 × 200 m freestyle relay at the 2001 World Aquatics Championships in Fukuoka, Japan, Hass was a spectator for the final, when the Australians set a world record of 7:04.66 mins. He went on to swim in the semifinal of the 200 m backstroke finishing 9th. At the 2002 FINA Short Course World Championships, Hass won a gold medal for Australia as part of the 4 × 200 m freestyle relay, swimming alongside compatriots Leon Dunne, Todd Pearson and Grant Hackett. Injury sidelined Hass in 2002, and despite representing Australia at the 2003 World Aquatics Championships in Barcelona, Spain, he never fully regained his earlier form.

References

1977 births
Living people
People from Pretoria
Australian male backstroke swimmers
Australian male freestyle swimmers
Australian Institute of Sport swimmers
Medalists at the FINA World Swimming Championships (25 m)
Goodwill Games medalists in swimming
Competitors at the 2001 Goodwill Games
People educated at Ivanhoe Grammar School